Villerupt is a commune in the Meurthe-et-Moselle department in north-eastern France.

A festival takes place in the commune each year in October-November.

Population

Notable people from Villerupt

 Aurélie Filippetti
 Olivier Jacque

See also
Communes of the Meurthe-et-Moselle department

References 

Communes of Meurthe-et-Moselle